Liverpool West Toxteth was a parliamentary constituency represented in the House of Commons of the Parliament of the United Kingdom. It elected one Member of Parliament (MP) by the first past the post system of election.

Boundaries 
1885–1918: Part of the civil parish of Toxteth.

1918–1950: The County Borough of Liverpool wards of Brunswick, Dingle, and Prince's Park.

Members of Parliament

Election results

Elections in the 1880s

Elections in the 1890s

Elections in the 1900s

Elections in the 1910s 

General Election 1914–15:

Another General Election was required to take place before the end of 1915. The political parties had been making preparations for an election to take place and by the July 1914, the following candidates had been selected; 
Unionist: Robert Houston
Liberal:

Elections in the 1920s

Elections in the 1930s 

General Election 1939–40

Another General Election was required to take place before the end of 1940. The political parties had been making preparations for an election to take place and by the Autumn of 1939, the following candidates had been selected;
Labour: Evelyn Walkden 
Conservative:

Elections in the 1940s

References 

Parliamentary constituencies in North West England (historic)
West Toxteth
Constituencies of the Parliament of the United Kingdom established in 1885
Constituencies of the Parliament of the United Kingdom disestablished in 1950
Toxteth